Chandur is a census town and Municipality in Nalgonda district  in the state of Telangana, India. It is located in Chandur mandal of Nalgonda division Postal code or Pin code :508255. A beautiful and peaceful town. There are various legends about the etymology of the name one of the folklore says
Chandi uuru(The village of goddess Chandi) as there is a famous Chandi maata temple of which the deity resembles to the goddess Durga of Vijayawada and is said to be commenced at the same time of the famous temple.

Geography 
It has an average elevation of 484 metres (1587 feet).

Demographics 
 India census, Chandur had a population of 10,762. Males constitute 50% of the population and females 50%. Chandur has an average literacy rate of 62%, higher than the national average of 59.5%; with male literacy of 73% and female literacy of 51%. 14% of the population is under 6 years of age.

Education
Don Bosco Junior College is the famous college in Chandur. Students from the surrounding villages pursue their studies at this college. Every year on January 31, Don Bosco feast is celebrated with pomp and joy. This college has been catering to poor students in order to  have access to quality education through varies cultural and multi skill activities. Chandur is also known for schools, there are 8+ schools with high standards and with transportation facilities around the surrounding villages.

Religion
-  Markandeya Temple
 

- chinthanjaneya temple

-  Jama Masjid

- Don Bosco Church

-   EID GAH

- Kanakadurga devi temple

-Hanuman Temple

- Subrahmanyam Swamy Temple

-Lord Shiva Temple

- Masjid Noor

List of Villages in Chandur Mandal 
  Angadipeta
  Bangarigadda
  Bodangi Parthy
  Donipamula(jogigudem)
  Gundrepalle
  Idikuda
  Kasthala
  Kondapuram
  Kumandaniguda
  Lakkinenigudem
  Nermata 
  Pullemla
  Sirdepalle
  Theratpalle
  Thummalapalle (ThimmaReddy Gudem)
  Kotayagudem
  Udathala Palle
Ghattuppal

References

Cities and towns in Nalgonda district
Mandal headquarters in Nalgonda district